Geothermal Rising (formally Geothermal Resources Council) is an international non-profit association of professionals in the field of geothermal energy. It is based in Davis, California. It was founded in Olympia in Washington state in May 1971, and its first conference was held in El Centro, California, in February 1972. It was incorporated in June of that year.

See also 
 Geothermal energy
 Geothermal exploration
 Geothermal power

References

Trade associations based in the United States
Renewable energy organizations based in the United States